Rich Relations is a 1986 play by American playwright David Henry Hwang. Hwang's first play with  all non-Asian characters, it depicts the rich WASP Orr family and the damage within from parent to child, with many religious overtones. The play premiered at the McGinn-Cazale Theatre on April 21, 1986 Off-Broadway as part of the Second Stage Theatre. It was directed by Harry Kondoleon, with Phoebe Cates and Keith Szarabajka.

It is currently published by Playscripts, Inc.

References

Plays by David Henry Hwang
1986 plays